The Queen Killing Kings are an American rock band based out of New Haven, Connecticut. Originally a duo started in 2006 by lead singer/songwriter/pianist Coley O'Toole, the band has expanded into a four-piece with the release of their debut album, Tidal Eyes.

Biography
Growing up in Shelton, Connecticut, frontman Coley O'Toole cited the rock music of Neil Young, Elton John, Supertramp, and the Doors along with the energy of the mid- to late-1990s Connecticut music scene as having a great influence on him.

The inspiration for the band's name came from O'Toole's realization that all things must come to an end. Starting the band in the midst of a broken heart, O'Toole used a Queen and a King to depict two very powerful forms of an alliance. The alliance would eventually end and the Queen and King would ultimately destroy each other.

In 2006, after a decade of playing in various projects based in Connecticut, O'Toole formed the Queen Killing Kings with drummer Jon Scerbo.  The duo was met with praise in the local venues and media.

With performances in Los Angeles and New York City, the band's initial success was extended beyond the local area, gaining them industry attention.  After entering the Manhattan's Pyramid Studios to record what would become their debut album, former Hot Rod Circuit member and O'Toole's childhood friend Joe Ballaro joined the band on bass. Scerbo left the band early in the recording process, prompting O'Toole to bring in former Hot Rod Circuit drummer Dan Duggins.  After signing to Wind-up Records, Zac Clark joined to play Fender Rhodes and organ, making the band a quartet.

The band's debut album, Tidal Eyes, was released digitally by Wind-up Records on July 14, 2009.

Discography
Tidal Eyes (Wind-Up, 2009)

References

Indie rock musical groups from Connecticut
Musicians from New Haven, Connecticut
Musical groups established in 2006